Thomas Irving (born 1842, date of death unknown) was a Union Navy sailor in the American Civil War and a recipient of the U.S. military's highest decoration, the Medal of Honor, for helping to free his grounded ship.

Born in 1842 in England, Irving immigrated to the United States and was living in New York when he joined the U.S. Navy.

On November 16, 1863, Lehigh was in Charleston Harbor providing support for Union troops on shore when the ship ran aground on a sand bar and came under heavy fire from Fort Moultrie. Both times, the cable snapped due to friction and hostile fire. Officers were about to give an "abandon ship" order when three more sailors, Landsman Frank S. Gile, Landsman William Williams, and Seaman Horatio Nelson Young, volunteered to make one more attempt. This last effort was successful and Nahant was able to tow Lehigh off the sandbar to safety. For this action, all five sailors involved in the operation were awarded the Medal of Honor on April 16, 1864.

Irving's official Medal of Honor citation reads:
Served on board the U.S.S. Lehigh, Charleston Harbor, 16 November 1863, during the hazardous task of freeing the Lehigh, which had grounded, and was under heavy enemy fire from Fort Moultrie. Rowing the small boat which was used in the hazardous task of transferring hawsers from the Lehigh to the Nahant. Irving twice succeeded in making the trip, while under severe fire from the enemy, only to find that each had been in vain when the hawsers were cut by hostile fire and chaffing.

Irving was promoted to acting master's mate before leaving the Navy in January 1865.

References 

1842 births
Year of death unknown
English emigrants to the United States
People of New York (state) in the American Civil War
Union Navy sailors
United States Navy Medal of Honor recipients
English-born Medal of Honor recipients
American Civil War recipients of the Medal of Honor